Peter Chippendale (one source states Peter Chippindale),  (17 April 1862–1941) was an English footballer who played in The Football League as a centre-half for Accrington.

Signed by his home town club Church in 1887 he moved to one of the founding clubs of the Football League, just two miles up the road at Accrington.

Season 1888-89

Chippendale played six League games for Accrington and scored one League goal. Peter Chippendale made his League debut on 8 September 1888, in the first ever Football League game to be played at Anfield, then home of Everton. Accrington lost the match 2–1. Peter Chippendale scored his debut and only League goal in a 5–5 draw with Blackburn Rovers played at Leamington Road, then home of Blackburn Rovers on 15 September 1888. As a defender he played in a defence line that kept the opposition to one-goal-in-a-League-match once.

Season 1889-90

Peter Chippendale did not play any League matches in 1889-90. He made one first team appearance in the FA Cup. On 25 January 1890 Accrington had a home First Round Replay with  West Bromwich Albion. The first match was also played at Thorneyholme Road and Accrington won 3-1. However, West Bromwich Albion protested, successfully, at the state of the pitch and F.A. ordered the match to be replayed. In the Replay Peter Chippendale came in for Arthur Wilkinson and Accrington won 3-0. That was his last game for a League Team. He became a printer at Broadoak, Accrington until his retirement and died in 1941.

Statistics
Source:

References

1862 births
1941 deaths
People from Church, Lancashire
Sportspeople from Lancashire
English footballers
English Football League players
Association football central defenders
Church F.C. players
Accrington F.C. players